Clemenswerth Palace (Schloss Clemenswerth) is a hunting complex or jagdschloss built in Sögel by Clemens August of Bavaria.

Bibliography
  Emsländischer Heimatbund (ed.): Clemenswerth – Schloss im Emsland. Sögel
  Emslandmuseum Schloss Clemenswerth - Ein Museum schafft sich eine gesteigerte Identität, in: Jahrbuch des Emsländischen Heimatbundes Bd. 56/2010, Sögel 2009, S. 295–302.

Baroque architecture in Lower Saxony
Castles in Lower Saxony
Hunting lodges in Germany
Buildings and structures in Emsland
Episcopal palaces in Germany